Caritas Christi Health Care was a non-profit Catholic healthcare system in the New England region of the United States. It was established in 1985 and was the second largest healthcare system in New England. In 2010, Caritas Christi was sold to the private equity firm Cerberus Capital Management, which converted it to a for-profit company and renamed it Steward Health Care System. Cain Brothers acted as Caritas Christi's advisor for this transaction, for which they received Deal of the Year honors from Investment Dealer's Digest.

Caritas Christi was an integrated healthcare network providing community based medicine and tertiary care in eastern Massachusetts, southern New Hampshire and Rhode Island.  Caritas Christi Health Care had 12,000 employees, 1,552 hospital beds, 2,305 doctors, 1,880 nurses, 73,546 annual inpatient discharges, 238,551 annual emergency department visits and fifty five communities served.

Caritas Christi Health Care was led by President/CEO Ralph de la Torre, MD and located within the St. Elizabeth's Medical Center campus.

Hospitals

In 1998, Caritas Christi acquired St. Joseph Health Services of Rhode Island.

Other facilities
Non-acute Caritas Christi facilities which offered a variety of services included Caritas Home Care, Caritas Good Samaritan Hospice, Caritas Labouré College, Caritas St. Mary's Women and Children's Center, Caritas Por Cristo, and the Caritas Physician Network.

References

External links
Caritas Christi official website (archived 2010)

Hospital networks in the United States
Healthcare in Boston
Economy of Boston
Cerberus Capital Management companies
Medical and health organizations based in Massachusetts
Catholic hospital networks in the United States
Catholic hospitals in North America
Catholic health care